Yu Yang (born 24 September 1979) is a Chinese men's field hockey player who participated at the 2008 Summer Olympics. He also won a silver medal at the 2006 Asian Games, where he scored 2 goals.

References

External links
 

1979 births
Chinese male field hockey players
Olympic field hockey players of China
Living people
Sportspeople from Dalian
Asian Games silver medalists for China
Asian Games medalists in field hockey
Field hockey players at the 2006 Asian Games
Field hockey players at the 2002 Asian Games
Medalists at the 2006 Asian Games
Field hockey players at the 2008 Summer Olympics
Sportspeople from Gansu